Derek Nesbitt (born April 16, 1982) is a Canadian former professional ice hockey player who played in the American Hockey League (AHL) and ECHL.

Playing career
Undrafted, Nesbitt previously played with Wilkes-Barre/Scranton Penguins in the 2012-13 season. He was traded to Wilkes-Barre from the Peoria Rivermen on April 10, 2013.

On July 12, 2013, Nesbitt agreed to a one-year AHL contract with the Oklahoma City Barons as a free agent. Nesbitt started the 2013-14 season with the Barons, scoring 10 goals and 19 points in 38 games before he was traded to the San Antonio Rampage on January 17, 2014. He second stint with the Rampage lasted just 5 games before he was again traded for future considerations to the Chicago Wolves on February 8, 2014.

A free agent, Nesbitt opted to pursue a European career, signing a one-year contract with Italian EBEL champions, HC Bolzano on August 20, 2014. After a season in Austria, Nesbitt returned to North America on a one-year contract for a fourth stint with the Gwinnett Gladiators, later renamed the Atlanta Gladiators on August 1, 2015.

After six seasons with the Gladiators, having become a cornerstone player and captain for Atlanta, Nesbitt announced his retirement from a 16-year professional career on July 11, 2022.

On November 8, 2022, the Gladiators named Nesbitt as Assistant Coach.

Career statistics

References

External links

1982 births
Living people
Atlanta Gladiators players
Bolzano HC players
Bossier-Shreveport Mudbugs players
Canadian ice hockey right wingers
Chicago Wolves players
Ferris State Bulldogs men's ice hockey players
Gwinnett Gladiators players
Idaho Steelheads (ECHL) players
Manitoba Moose players
Oklahoma City Barons players
Peoria Rivermen (AHL) players
Rockford IceHogs (AHL) players
San Antonio Rampage players
Toledo Walleye players
Wilkes-Barre/Scranton Penguins players
Canadian expatriate ice hockey players in Italy